Seandrea Sledge (born March 28, 1994), better known by her stage name Dreezy, is an American rapper, singer, and actress. She signed with Interscope Records in 2014 where she released the studio albums No Hard Feelings (2016) and Big Dreez (2019). In 2020, she split from the label and released Hitgirl (2022), a collaboration album with Hit-Boy.

Early life 
Sledge was born and raised on the South Side of Chicago, Illinois. Throughout her childhood, Sledge moved to a number of locations throughout the city of Chicago. To escape issues that a number of teens face (blended families, constantly having new friends, and problems at home) Sledge looked into the fine arts, which helped her deal with some of the realities of her life. She explored scatting, poetry writing, and drifted towards singing at the age of 10. Sledge always felt like music was her internal escapism, and by the age of 14, she found interest in becoming a rapper. Sledge has cited rappers J. Cole and Lil Wayne as her biggest musical influences, referring to the former as her favourite rapper of all time.

Career

2012–2013: Early beginnings 
Dreezy was putting more time into rapping, she became good friends with fellow Chicago native rapper Sasha Go Hard, and made a guest appearance on Sasha's song, "I Ain't No Hitta" in 2012. Dreezy later released a song with a fellow rapper Lil Durk, called "Ghost". In February 2013, Dreezy released a collaborative mixtape with fellow Chicago native rapper Mikey Dollaz, titled Business N Pleasure. In February 2014, she released her first solo mixtape, titled Schizo through AOE Music, along with a song, which features guest verse from a fellow Chicago rapper Common, called "No Good".

2014–2019: Signing to Interscope Records and No Hard Feelings 
In April 2014, she released her remix of rappers Nicki Minaj and Lil Herb's "Chiraq" and received general attention, with many fans claiming that it was better than Minaj's version. The remix later garnered her attention and landed her a collaboration with rapper Common on his tenth studio album Nobody's Smiling. In 2014, she was named as the "Princess of Chicago Rap" by Noisey via Vice. In December 2014, it was announced that Dreezy signed a recording contract with Interscope Records.

On July 28, 2015, Dreezy released her debut EP titled Call It What You Want. On December 25, 2015, Dreezy released another EP titled From Now On to digital retailers and streaming via Interscope Records. In January 2016, Dreezy released single "Body" which became her first single to enter the Billboard Hot 100 and later peaked at number 62. Her debut album, No Hard Feelings, was released on July 15, 2016.

In 2018, she performed at Rolling Loud. In January 2019, she released her second studio album Big Dreez. She appeared in the Netflix film Beats as Queen Cabrini.

2020–present: Going independent 
In 2020, she split from Interscope Records and went independent.

On May 11, 2022, Dreezy released the song "Balance My Lows" featuring rapper Coi Leray. It is the lead single from her collaborative album with American record producer Hit-Boy, Hitgirl, which was then released on May 20, 2022.

Discography

Studio albums

Collaboration albums

Extended plays

Mixtapes

Singles

As lead artist

As featured artist

Filmography

Film

Awards and nominations

Notes

References

External links 
 
 

1994 births
Living people
21st-century American rappers
Interscope Records artists
Pop rappers
African-American women rappers
American hip hop singers
African-American women singer-songwriters
21st-century African-American women singers
Hardcore hip hop artists
Midwest hip hop musicians
21st-century women rappers